Potamocypris steueri is a species of ostracod crustaceans in the family Cyprididae, subfamily Cypridopsinae found in marine brackish waters of the Mediterranean Basin as well as in brackish coastal waters of the Black Sea and the Caspian Sea.

Description
The carapace of P. steueri appears subovate in lateral view. It is light green with four dark green transverse stripes. The length ranges from 0.55 to 0.68 mm, with females being slightly larger than males.

The second antennae carry swimming setae that slightly extend beyond the tips of the terminal claws.

References

External links

Cyprididae
Freshwater crustaceans of Africa
Crustaceans described in 1935